Eric Bruce Rimm is an American nutrition scientist and epidemiologist. He is Professor of Epidemiology and Nutrition at the Harvard School of Public Health, Professor of Medicine at Harvard Medical School, and director of the Harvard School of Public Health's Program in Cardiovascular Epidemiology. He has researched the relationship between diet and the risk of chronic diseases such as obesity.

References

External links
Faculty page

Living people
American nutritionists
American epidemiologists
Harvard School of Public Health alumni
Harvard School of Public Health faculty
University of Wisconsin–Madison College of Letters and Science alumni
Harvard Medical School faculty
Year of birth missing (living people)